Tuapsinsky District is an administrative district (raion), one of the thirty-eight in Krasnodar Krai, Russia. As a municipal division, it is incorporated as Tuapsinsky Municipal District. It is located in the south of the krai. Its administrative center is the town of Tuapse (which is not administratively a part of the district). Population:

Administrative and municipal status
Within the framework of administrative divisions, Tuapsinsky District is one of the thirty-eight in the krai. The town of Tuapse serves as its administrative center, despite being incorporated separately as an administrative unit with the status equal to that of the districts.

As a municipal division, the district is incorporated as Tuapsinsky Municipal District, with the Town of Tuapse being incorporated within it as Tuapsinskoye Urban Settlement.

References

Notes

Sources

Districts of Krasnodar Krai
 
